Aasha Mehreen Amin is a Bangladeshi journalist and writer, former editor of the weekly magazine Star and the former head of the Editorial team at The Daily Star. She is currently joint editor at The Daily Star.

Biography
Aasha Mehreen Amin was born in Dhaka to a Bengali Muslim family. Her father, Anwarul Amin Makhon, was the second-eldest son of former Prime Minister of Pakistan Nurul Amin, and the former general manager of BCCI Bangladesh, known for opening Bangladesh Bank's first branch abroad (in London). Her mother, Razia Khan Amin, was an Ekushey Padak-winning writer, poet, and professor at the University of Dhaka, and her maternal grandfather, Maulvi Tamizuddin Khan, was a speaker of the parliament of Pakistan. She studied in Boston College, Massachusetts, United States of America, graduating with a Bachelor of Science in 1991.

Career
She started as a feature writer at The Daily Star, the largest circulated English language newspaper in Bangladesh, in June 1991. She received a journalism fellowship from the University of California at Berkeley where she studied environmental and investigative journalism in 1993. She is the editor of the weekly Star published by The Daily Star, a position she has held since 1996. She publishes her own satirical column in the magazine called Postscript and a current events column No Strings Attached in the newspaper. She is the deputy editor of the Editorial and Op-ed section of The Daily Star.

Personal life
Aasha Mehreen Amin is married and has one child.

References

Living people
Bangladeshi women journalists
Bangladeshi women writers
UC Berkeley Graduate School of Journalism alumni
Boston College alumni
Year of birth missing (living people)